The Olympus Tough TG-5 is a weatherised digital compact camera announced by Olympus Corporation on May 17, 2017. It differs from its predecessor, the Olympus Tough TG-4, by including a new sensor and processor, advanced tracking capabilities, and 4K video capture.

The TG-5 is technically very similar to the Olympus TG-4. The physical dimensions (length x width x depth) of the TG-4 and the TG-5 are identical. In May 2019, the camera was superseded by the Olympus Tough TG-6.

References
http://www.getolympus.com/digitalcameras/tough/tg-5.html

External links 
 

Olympus digital cameras
Cameras introduced in 2017